Ralph James Gregory (19 June 1921 – 2002) was an English footballer who played as a forward for Port Vale, Witton Albion, Congleton Town, and Stafford Rangers.

Career
Gregory signed professional forms with Port Vale in August 1944. He scored on his debut in a Midland Cup, Qualifying Tournament match on 14 April 1945, a 2–1 defeat to Notts County at Meadow Lane on 14 April 1945. He continued to play for the club when on leave from his service in the Royal Marines during World War II. He was transferred to Cheshire County League club Witton Albion in March 1947. He scored five goals in ten games in the 1946–47 season, 31 goals from 53 games in the 1947–48 campaign and two goals from fifteen games in the 1948–49 Cheshire County League title winning season. He later played for Congleton Town and Stafford Rangers.

Career statistics

Honours
Witton Albion
Cheshire County League: 1948–49

References

1921 births
2002 deaths
Footballers from Stoke-on-Trent
Royal Marines personnel of World War II
English footballers
Association football forwards
Port Vale F.C. players
Witton Albion F.C. players
Congleton Town F.C. players
Stafford Rangers F.C. players
Military personnel from Staffordshire